Rajin may refer to:

Places
Rajin-guyok, a district on the northeast coast of North Korea
Rajin station, a railway station in Rajin-guyŏk
Rajin-Sŏnbong, now known as Rason, a North Korean city and ice-free port in the Sea of Japan in the North Pacific Ocean on the northeast tip of North Korea
Rajin, Iran, a village in Zanjanrud-e Pain Rural District, Zanjanrud District, Zanjan County, Zanjan Province, Iran

People
Given name
Rajin (singer), or Rijan, a Danish singer known as Node of Kurdish origin
Rajin Saleh (born 1983), Bangladeshi cricketer

Surname
Momčilo Rajin (born 1954), Serbian art and music critic, theorist and historian, artist, publisher